New Circle Road, also known as Kentucky Route 4, is a Kentucky state highway that serves as an inner beltway around Lexington, which is part of the consolidated city-county government with Fayette County.

The state designates the start and finish of the road at its interchange with Nicholasville Road on the city's south side. Exit numbering increases as one travels clockwise.

Roughly three-fourths of the highway is limited-access, with all movements controlled at 10 interchanges. The remainder is classified as an urban principal arterial highway with a heavy mix of driveway entrances and intersections with one single-point urban interchange at US 60 (Winchester Road) and a diverging diamond interchange at US 68 (Harrodsburg Road). The dividing line between the limited-access segment and the urban arterial highway is US 25 (Richmond and Georgetown Roads) north and east of the city.

New Circle Road suffers serious traffic congestion during rush hour due to the lack of other freeways running through the city. Harrodsburg Road, Nicholasville Road, Tates Creek Road, and Newtown Pike also suffer serious congestion because of people trying to get on New Circle and head out of downtown Lexington.

History
New Circle Road was constructed in several segments from 1950 to 1967 as a circumferential bypass. The first segment to be built, from KY 922 (Newtown Pike) to US 25 (Richmond Road)/US 421, was constructed by the city of Lexington in 1952 as two-lane connector road. The original section included at-grade intersections at Palumbo Drive, KY 1927 (Liberty Road), KY 57 (Bryan Station Road), Old Paris Pike, US 27/US 68, and at KY 353 (Russell Cave Road), with one interchange at US 60 (Winchester Road). This segment of the road is also known as the Northern Belt Line or the US 25 Bypass.

To help finance the construction of the original 1952 portion, driveway access was sold to property owners along the route.

After the opening, this section experienced rapid growth and the need to widen it to four lanes from two became evident. In 1958, maintenance was taken over by the state and construction began on the widening to four lanes as it became US 25 Bypass.

The remainder of the highway around Lexington was constructed to near-urban freeway standards with controlled access.  Construction of interchanges at US 25 (Richmond Road)/US 421, KY 1974 (Tates Creek Road), US 27 (Nicholasville Road), US 68 (Harrodsburg Road), US 60 (Versailles Road), KY 1681 (Old Frankfort Pike), US 421 (Leestown Road), US 25 (Georgetown Road) and at KY 922 (Newtown Pike). The interchange with Alumni Drive was constructed in late 1984 at a cost of $2 million with the extension of what was then Mount Tabor Road southeastward towards Man o' War Boulevard.

Winchester Road/US 60 interchange reconstruction
The interchange with US 60 (Winchester Road), built in 1961, was sorely out-of-date by the 1980s. Tight  ramps and a narrow underpass with no acceleration or deceleration lanes made this a dangerous pseudo-cloverleaf interchange. Trucks, too tall for the substandard overpass height clearance, would frequently damage the bridge girders. Work started in the late 1990s to convert this outdated exit into a single-point urban interchange (SPUI). There are two left turn lanes on each ramp, and those are controlled by a single traffic light instead of two. Longer ramps for  merging onto New Circle Road were added. In the fall of 2000, the new Winchester Road interchange opened to traffic at a cost of $8.1 million.

Reconstructing New Circle Road
An early study, part of the "Urban County Government's Year 2000 Transportation Plan", stated that New Circle should be widened to six-lanes by the year 2000.

In 1987, the Lexington-Fayette Urban County Government recommended a solution to the  section of New Circle Road from Georgetown Road/US 25 to Richmond Road/US 25/US 421. New Circle Road in the northeastern quadrant of Lexington has high traffic volumes, numerous accidents and traffic delays as motorists face numerous commercial access points, congested intersections, poor traffic signal progressions, and a very low level of service made worse during peak hours. None of these recommendations by the urban government were implemented however.

By 1997, a section of New Circle from Tates Creek Road to Nicholasville Road was averaging more than 60,000 vehicles per day, up from 17,000 30 years ago and an increase of 256%.

In August 1999, the Kentucky Transportation Center at the University of Kentucky College of Engineering completed Research Report KTC-99-55, "Conversion of New Circle Road to a limited Access Facility". The study compared the addition of one lane in each direction with the use of median U-turns and restricted left-turn strategies at selected intersections from Newtown Pike/KY 922 to Richmond Road/US 25/US 421. This was presented to the Lexington Area Metropolitan Planning Organization and is considered to have been the stimulus for the development of the New Circle Road Northeast improvement study that began on December 1 of 1999.

Four alternatives for the segment from Newtown Pike/KY 922 to Richmond Road/US 25/US 421 were presented and a fifth was introduced later after combining several key ideas that the residents voiced their approval of at several public meetings:

Recent construction projects
In November 2012, the Kentucky Department of Transportation announced the widening of New Circle Road from four to six lanes from just west of Georgetown Road to Versailles Road. Construction began in the fall of 2013 and was completed in 2016 at a cost of $80 million.

Exit list

See also
 
 List of roads in Lexington, Kentucky

References

External links

 
KY 4 at KentuckyRoads.com
New Circle Road Widening Project

Beltways in the United States
Transportation in Lexington, Kentucky
Freeways in the United States
Expressways in the United States